The Old Stone House, also known as the Stone House Hotel, Rinehart House or Rinehart Stone House Museum, is a building and museum located in Vale, Oregon, listed on the National Register of Historic Places.  The building was the first permanent building in the community of "Stone House", renamed to "Vale" in 1887.

It is a  building from Oregon's early settlement period, built of local sandstone in 1872.  It has imitation Italianate-style elements in its shallow hipped roof, overhanging eaves, and round arch heads over its windows and door on the first story.  It originally had a front porch with a deck served by a doorway in the center of its second floor.

See also
 National Register of Historic Places listings in Malheur County, Oregon

References

External links
 Rinehart Stone House - Vale Chamber of Commerce

Buildings and structures in Malheur County, Oregon
History museums in Oregon
Museums in Malheur County, Oregon
National Register of Historic Places in Malheur County, Oregon
Stone houses in the United States
Vale, Oregon
1872 establishments in Oregon
Houses completed in 1872